David Stephen Miller is a retired American professional darts player who competed in the 1980s.

Career 
Miller competed in the 1982 BDO World Darts Championship, defeating Gordon Allpress in the first round and Tony Brown in the second round 2-0, but was defeated in the quarter-final by Scotland's Jocky Wilson.

Miller quit the BDO in 1983.

World Championship results

BDO 
 1982: Quarter Finals (lost to Jocky Wilson 0-4)

References

External links 
David Miller's stats and profile on Darts Database

American darts players
Living people
Year of birth missing (living people)
British Darts Organisation players